George Hypolite [hip-puh-light] (born August 1, 1987) is a former American football defensive tackle. He was signed by the Jacksonville Jaguars as an undrafted free agent in 2009. He played college football at Colorado.

College career
While playing for Colorado, He was given the nickname "The Rabid Goldfish" because Colorado alumnus Trey Parker (as Cartman) was announcing the starting lineup names, and called Hypolite "The Rabid Goldfish."
He is now a law school graduate from the University of San Diego.

Professional career

Jacksonville Jaguars
After going undrafted in the 2009 NFL Draft, Hypolite signed with the Jacksonville Jaguars as an undrafted free agent on April 26. He was waived by the team on July 23 when the team signed defensive tackle Montavious Stanley.

Carolina Panthers
Hypolite was signed by the Carolina Panthers on August 5, 2009 after defensive tackle Ma'ake Kemoeatu suffered as season-ending injury. He finished his stint with the Panthers by being terminated from the practice squad on September 22, 2009.

Post-retirement
Hypolite earned a juris doctor degree from the University of San Diego School of Law in 2014 and became an assistant city attorney with the City and County of Denver.

External links
Carolina Panthers bio
Colorado Buffaloes bio
Jacksonville Jaguars bio
Alumni update: Hypolite Cherishes 'CU Experience'

1987 births
Living people
Players of American football from Los Angeles
American football defensive tackles
Colorado Buffaloes football players
Jacksonville Jaguars players
Carolina Panthers players